West Bank First League is the second tier of the Palestinian Football Association (PFA).  It began in 1985 and Shabab Al-Dhahiriya SC won the championship.  In 2008 the league had 4 groups, all the groups had 10 clubs, and there were 3 stages.

Past winners
 1985-86 :- Shabab Al-Dhahiriya SC (1)
 1998-99 :- Taraji Wadi Al-Nes (1)
 2008-09 :- Shabab Al-Obidiya (1)
 2009-10 :- Markaz Balata (1)
 2011-12 :- Ahli Al-Khalil (1)
 2012-13 :- Thaqafi Tulkarem (1)
 2013-14 :- Shabab Yatta (1) and Shabab Dura (1)
 2014-15 :- Silwan SC
 2015-16 :- Markaz Tulkarem
 2016-17 :- Mosaset Al-Bireh
 2017-18 :- Shabab Al-Am'ari
 2018-19 :- Al-Quwwat Al-Falistinia
 2019-20 :- Shabab Al-Dhahiriya
 2020-21 :- Markaz Tulkarem
 2021-22 :- Taraji Wadi Al-Nes

Source: kooora.com

References

 
2
Sports leagues established in 1985
Second level football leagues in Asia
1985 establishments in the Israeli Civil Administration area